Mount Farnham is British Columbia's 17th highest peak, and 21st most prominent. It was named after Paulding Farnham from New York. It is the highest peak in the Purcells (a subset of the larger Columbia mountain range).

See also
 Geography of British Columbia
 List of Ultras of North America

References

External links
 "Mount Farnham, British Columbia" on Peakbagger

Farnham
Purcell Mountains
Kootenay Land District